7-Hydroxy-2,3,4,8-tetramethoxyphenanthrene is one of several phenanthrenes contained in the rhizome of Dioscorea communis.

References 

Phenanthrenoids